The 2018 Food City 300 was the 22nd stock car race of the 2018 NASCAR Xfinity Series season, and the 37th iteration of the event. The race was held on Friday, August 17, 2018, in Bristol, Tennessee at Bristol Motor Speedway, a 0.533 miles (0.858 km) permanent oval-shaped racetrack. The race was extended from its scheduled 300 laps to 310 laps due to a NASCAR overtime finish. At race's end, Kyle Larson of Chip Ganassi Racing would be able to told off Joe Gibbs Racing driver Christopher Bell and JR Motorsports driver Justin Allgaier on the overtime restart to win his 12th and to date, final career NASCAR Xfinity Series win and his fourth and final win of his part-time season. Bell and Allgaier would fill the podium, finishing second and third, respectively.

Background 

The Bristol Motor Speedway, formerly known as Bristol International Raceway and Bristol Raceway, is a NASCAR short track venue located in Bristol, Tennessee. Constructed in 1960, it held its first NASCAR race on July 30, 1961. Despite its short length, Bristol is among the most popular tracks on the NASCAR schedule because of its distinct features, which include extraordinarily steep banking, an all concrete surface, two pit roads, and stadium-like seating. It has also been named one of the loudest NASCAR tracks.

Entry list

Practice

First practice 
The first practice session would occur on Thursday, August 16, at 10:05 AM EST, and would last for 50 minutes.

Second and final practice 
The second and final practice session, sometimes referred to as Happy Hour, would occur on Thursday, August 16, at 1:35 PM EST, and would last for 50 minutes.

Qualifying 
Qualifying was held on Friday, August 17, at 3:40 PM EST. Since Bristol Motor Speedway is under 2 miles (3.2 km), the qualifying system was a multi-car system that included three rounds. The first round was 15 minutes, where every driver would be able to set a lap within the 15 minutes. Then, the second round would consist of the fastest 24 cars in Round 1, and drivers would have 10 minutes to set a lap. Round 3 consisted of the fastest 12 drivers from Round 2, and the drivers would have 5 minutes to set a time. Whoever was fastest in Round 3 would win the pole.

No drivers would fail to qualify.

Full qualifying results

Race results 
Stage 1 Laps: 85

Stage 2 Laps: 85

Stage 3 Laps: 130

References 

2018 NASCAR Xfinity Series
NASCAR races at Bristol Motor Speedway
August 2018 sports events in the United States
2018 in sports in Tennessee